The 2004–05 Australian Figure Skating Championships was held in Sydney from 21 through 28 August 2004. Skaters competed in the disciplines of men's singles, ladies' singles, and ice dancing across many levels, including senior, junior, novice, adult, and the pre-novice disciplines of primary and intermediate.

Senior results

Men

Ladies

Ice dancing

External links
 results

2004 in figure skating
2005 in figure skating
Fig
Fig
Australian Figure Skating Championships